Mark Winston Kiger (born May 30, 1980) is an American former professional baseball infielder. Kiger made his Major League Baseball (MLB) debut in the 2006 postseason, and never played in an MLB regular season game.  He is the only player in major league history to have played his entire career in the postseason, and one of only six players to have made their major league debut in the postseason.

Amateur career
Kiger attended La Jolla High School in La Jolla, California. Out of high school, Kiger was drafted by the Boston Red Sox in the 27th round of the 1999 Major League Baseball Draft, but did not sign.  He attended Grossmont College, then transferred to the University of Florida, where he played for coach Andy Lopez and coach Pat McMahon's Florida Gators baseball teams from 2000 to 2002.  He developed a reputation as a hitter, with a .403 batting average, 104 hits and ninety runs scored, while drawing sixty walks, in 2002.  After leading the team for three consecutive seasons in scoring, his 212 runs scored remains fifth on the Gators' career records list.

Professional career
The Oakland Athletics selected Kiger out of Florida as a fifth round selection in the 2002 Major League Baseball Draft. Kiger was initially assigned to the Vancouver Canadians, where he hit .244/.346/.362 while moving to second base. He led Class A Short Season Northwest League second basemen in fielding percentage (.969). In 2003, Kiger hit .281/.375/.411 with the Modesto A's. He cracked 38 doubles, scored 95 and drew 77 walks while striking out 106 times. He led the Class-A Advanced California League in walks.

In 2004, Kiger batted .263/.369/.355 for the Midland RockHounds of the Class AA Texas League and walked 78 times and was 3 for 13 with three walks for the Sacramento River Cats of the Class AAA Pacific Coast League. He led the Texas League in fielding percentage at second base (.979). The next season, he was back with Midland and had an almost identical season - .267/.360/.367, 68 walks and the league-leading fielding percentage at2B (.988). Starting another year at Midland in 2006, Kiger hit .307/.379/.450 and got a longer look at Sacramento (.233/.348/.330).

He was added to the Athletics roster in the ALCS after starting second baseman Mark Ellis was injured in the 2006 American League Division Series. Oakland had already suffered injuries to Bobby Crosby and Antonio Perez. Kiger was released by Oakland after the playoffs.

In January , he signed again with the New York Mets. He retired after the season.

See also 

 Florida Gators
 List of Florida Gators baseball players

References

External links 

Mark Kiger at Baseball Almanac

1980 births
Living people
American expatriate baseball players in Canada
Baseball players from San Diego
Binghamton Mets players
Buffalo Bisons (minor league) players
Florida Gators baseball players
Grossmont Griffins baseball players
Gulf Coast Mets players
Midland RockHounds players
Modesto A's players
New Orleans Zephyrs players
Oakland Athletics players
Sacramento River Cats players
Vancouver Canadians players
West Tennessee Diamond Jaxx players